Poor Millionaires (Swedish: Stackars miljonärer) is a 1936 Swedish comedy film directed by Ragnar Arvedson and Tancred Ibsen and starring Adolf Jahr, Anna Olin and Ernst Eklund. The film's sets were designed by the art director Manne Runsten. It is based on the 1934 novel Three Men in the Snow by Erich Kästner.

Synopsis
An unemployed engineer wins a competition, first prize of which is a vacation to a luxury resort in the mountains.

Cast
 Adolf Jahr as 	Jan Eriksson
 Anna Olin as 	Mrs. Eriksson
 Ernst Eklund as 	Georg Delmar
 Eleonor de Floer as 	Eva Delmar
 Nils Wahlbom as 	Johan
 Tollie Zellman as Mrs. Olander
 Olav Riégo as 	Holm
 Gerda Björne as 	Wholesalers wife
 Gudrun Brost as Hotel guest
 Carl Browallius as Larsson, clerk
 Eivor Engelbrektsson as 	Ofelia
 John Ericsson as 	Lumberer
 Georg Funkquist as 	Hovén, hotel manager
 Nils Hallberg as 	Bell boy
 Anna-Lisa Hydén as 	Hotel guest
 Håkan Jahnberg as 	Restaurant-keeper
 Nils Johannisson as 	Wholesaler
 Peggy Lindberg as 	Emma, cleaning lady
 Holger Löwenadler as 	Hotel guet wearing pyjama
 Charley Paterson as 	Manager at publicity department
 Inga-Bodil Vetterlund as 	Hotel guest
 Carl-Gunnar Wingård as Lövberg, porter

References

Bibliography 
 Larsson, Mariah & Marklund, Anders. Swedish Film: An Introduction and Reader. Nordic Academic Press, 2010.

External links 
 

1936 films
Swedish comedy films
1936 comedy films
1930s Swedish-language films
Films directed by Ragnar Arvedson
Films directed by Tancred Ibsen
Swedish black-and-white films
Films based on German novels
1930s Swedish films